The Northern Pacific coastal forests are temperate coniferous forest ecoregion of the Pacific coast of North America. It occupies a narrow coastal zone of Alaska, between the Pacific Ocean and the northernmost Pacific Coast Ranges, covering an area of 23,300 square miles (60,400 square kilometers), extending from the Alexander Archipelago in southeast Alaska along the Gulf of Alaska to the western Kenai Peninsula and eastern Kodiak Island. The Pacific Coastal Mountain icefields and tundra ecoregion lies inland, at higher elevations in the Coast Mountains. The ecoregion receives high rainfall, which varies considerably based on exposure and elevation. It contains a quarter of the world's remaining temperate rain forest.

Flora
Conifers are the characteristic trees, and the predominant species are Sitka spruce (Picea sitchensis), western hemlock (Tsuga heterophylla), and mountain hemlock (Tsuga mertensiana), together with shore pine (Pinus contorta), western red cedar (Thuja plicata), and yellow cedar (Callitropsis nootkatensis). Sites with poor drainage and along river channels are home to broadleaf trees, including alder (Alnus spp.), black cottonwood (Populus trichocarpa), and paper birch (Betula papyrifera).

Much of the ecoregion lies within the Tongass National Forest, Chugach National Forest, and Glacier Bay National Park.

See also
List of ecoregions in the United States (WWF)

References

External links

Ecoregions of Alaska
Ecozones and ecoregions of British Columbia
Forests of Alaska
Forests of British Columbia
Pacific temperate rainforests
Temperate coniferous forests of the United States
Plant communities of the West Coast of the United States
Nearctic ecoregions